Pimelea elongata is a species of flowering plant in the family Thymelaeaceae and is endemic to inland areas of eastern Australia. It is a slender forb with linear to narrowly elliptic leaves and spikes of hairy, yellowish-green flowers.

Description
Flowering occurs in most months and the fruit is green.

Taxonomy
Pimelea elongata was first formally described in 1980 by S. Threlfall in the journal Telopea from specimens collected near Cheepie in 1970.

Distribution and habitat
This pimelea grows in heavy-textured soils with a thin, sandy upper layer and is found in northern new South Wales, east of Charleville in south-eastern Queensland and in the northern Flinders Ranges in South Australia. It is poisonous to livestock.

Conservation status
This species is listed as "endangered" in New South Wales under the Biodiversity Conservation Act 2016.

References

elongata
Malvales of Australia
Plants described in 1980
Flora of South Australia
Flora of Queensland
Flora of New South Wales